Elections in the Regional Municipality of York of Ontario, Canada were held on October 22, 2018 in conjunction with municipal elections across the province.

Incumbents are marked with "(X)".

York Regional Council

Regional chair

The election was to be the first-ever direct election of the York Regional chair, but it was cancelled by the Ontario Government's passing of the Better Local Government Act.

Aurora
Source for results:

Mayor

Aurora Town Council
Six to be elected

East Gwillimbury

East Gwillimbury changed its council from 4 councillors elected "at large" from the town, to 6 councillors in a 3-ward system, with two councillors elected in each ward.

Mayor

Ward 1
Two to be elected.

Ward 2
Two to be elected.

Ward 3
Two to be elected.

Source:

Georgina
Source for results:

Mayor

Georgina Town Council

Regional Councillor

Ward 1

Ward 2

Ward 3

Ward 4

Ward 5

King
Source for results:

Mayor

Markham
List of candidates:
Source for results:

Mayor

City Council

Regional Councillor
In Markham, Regional Councillors serve on both the City Council as well as York Region Council. Electors can vote for up to four candidates on their ballots, equal to the total number that may be elected. The four winning candidates are those whom receive the highest number of votes. The candidate with the highest number of votes received also serves as Deputy Mayor.

Ward 1

Ward 2

Ward 3

Ward 4

Ward 5

Ward 6

Ward 7

Ward 8

Newmarket
Source for results:

Mayor

Newmarket Town Council

Deputy mayor and regional councillor

Ward 1

Ward 2

Ward 3

Ward 4

Ward 5

Ward 6

Ward 7

Richmond Hill
Source for results:

Richmond Hill Town Council

Regional council
Two to be elected.

Ward 1

Ward 2

Ward 3

Ward 4

Ward 5

Ward 6

Vaughan
Source for results:

Source:

Vaughan City Council

Regional council
Three to be elected.

Source:

Ward 1 Maple/Kleinburg

Source:

Ward 2 Woodbridge West

Source:

Ward 3 Woodbridge/Vellore

Source:

Ward 4 Concord/Thornhill

Source:

Ward 5 Thornhill

Source:

Whitchurch-Stouffville

Mayor

Source:

Whitchurch-Stouffville Town Council

Ward 1

Source:

Ward 2

Source:

Ward 3

Source:

Ward 4

Source:

Ward 5
 
Source:

Ward 6

Source:

York Region District School Board

Trustee - Area 1 (Vaughan Ward 1 & 2)

Source:

Anna DeBartolo submitted her resignation from the Trustee position on January 9, 2019, citing personal reasons.

Trustee - Area 2 (Vaughan Ward 3 & 4)

Source:

Trustee - Area 3 (Markham Ward 1 & Vaughan Ward 5)

Source:

Trustee - East Gwillimbury and Whitchurch-Stouffville

Trustee - Richmond Hill (Wards 1, 2 and 4)

York Catholic District School Board

Trustee - Area 1 (Vaughan Ward 1)

Trustee - Area 2 (Vaughan Ward 2)

Trustee - Area 3 (Vaughan Ward 3)

Trustee - Area 4 (Vaughan Ward 4 & 5)

Le Conseil scolaire Viamonde

Trustee - York Region

Source:

Conseil scolaire catholique MonAvenir

Trustee - York Region

References

York
Politics of the Regional Municipality of York